Igor Viktorovich Peremota (born January 14, 1981, in Kopeysk, Chelyabinsk) is a Russian hurdler.

He won a silver medal at the 2003 Summer Universiade, and competed in the 2004 Olympic Games where he was knocked out in the quarter final. He also reached the semi-finals at the 2005 World Athletics Championships, and finished fourth at the 2006 European Athletics Championships and sixth at the 2006 IAAF World Cup.

His personal best time is 13.37 seconds, achieved in June 2006 in Tula.

References

 
 

1981 births
Living people
Russian male hurdlers
Olympic male hurdlers
Olympic athletes of Russia
Athletes (track and field) at the 2004 Summer Olympics
Athletes (track and field) at the 2008 Summer Olympics
Universiade medalists in athletics (track and field)
Universiade silver medalists for Russia
Medalists at the 2003 Summer Universiade
World Athletics Championships athletes for Russia
Russian Athletics Championships winners
People from Kopeysk
Sportspeople from Chelyabinsk Oblast